Keavan Yazdani is a Grammy-nominated Canadian songwriter and multidisciplinary visual artist.

Career
Yazdani was born in Toronto, Ontario. He was born to a Persian father, and a Filipino mother. He has worked with artists such as Daniel Caesar, Justin Bieber, Koffee, River Tiber, H.E.R., Brandy Norwood and Sean Leon. He is the founder of, Joaquina, a creative outlet for his design.

Videography

Music videos 
As director:

Daniel Caesar: Coachella Barcelona Circuit (2020)
Daniel Caesar Feat. Koffee: Cyanide (Remix) (2019)
Daniel Caesar: Freudian (2017)
Daniel Caesar: We Find Love/Blessed (2017)
Daniel Caesar and H.E.R.: Best Part (2017)
River Tiber (Feat. Daniel Caesar) : West (2016)

Documentary 
As director:
Making It In Canada: Keavan Yazdani (2022)
Love Again: The Conversation (2019)

Awards and nominations

References

External links
 

Canadian songwriters
21st-century Canadian artists
Artists from Ontario
Living people
1993 births
Canadian music video directors